Girolamo Fracastoro (c. 1476/86 August 1553) was an Italian physician, poet, and scholar in mathematics, geography and astronomy. Fracastoro subscribed to the philosophy of atomism, and rejected appeals to hidden causes in scientific investigation. His studies of the mode of syphilis transmission are an early example of epidemiology.

Life

Fracastoro was born in Verona, Republic of Venice and educated at Padua where at the age of 19 he was appointed professor at the university. On account of his eminence in the practice of medicine, he was elected physician of the Council of Trent. A bronze statue was erected in his honor by the citizens of Padua, while his native city commemorated their great compatriot with a marble statue. He lived and practised in his hometown. In 1546 he proposed that epidemic diseases are caused by transferable tiny particles or "spores" that could transmit infection by direct contact, indirect contact, or even without contact over long distances. In his writing, the "spores" of diseases may refer to chemicals rather than to any living entities.

He appears to have first used the Latin word fomes, meaning tinder, in the sense of infectious agent, in his essay on contagion De Contagione et Contagiosis Morbis (On Contagion and Contagious Diseases), published in 1546: "I call fomites [from the Latin fomes, meaning "tinder"] such things as clothes, linen, etc., which although not themselves corrupt, can nevertheless foster the essential seeds of the contagion and thus cause infection." His theory remained influential for nearly three centuries, before being superseded by a fully developed germ theory.

The name for syphilis is derived from Fracastoro's 1530 epic poem in three books, Syphilis sive morbus gallicus ("Syphilis or The French Disease"), about a shepherd boy named Syphilus who tended the flocks of King Alcinous. Syphilus insulted Sol Pater, the god of the Sun, and was punished by him with a horrible disease. The poem suggests using mercury and "guaiaco" as a cure. In 1546 his book (De contagione, "On Contagion") also gave the first description of typhus. The collected works of Fracastoro appeared for the first time in 1555.

Alongside Syphilis, Fracastoro wrote a Biblical epic in two books, Joseph, and a collection of miscellaneous poems, Carmina. Joseph was translated under the title The Maidens Blush, or Joseph by Josuah Sylvester. A full edition and English translation of Fracastoro's poetry was prepared by James Gardner for The I Tatti Renaissance Library.

In 1546 Fracastoro described an epidemic in cattle that devastated farmers near Verona, Italy. That disease is now recognized as foot-and-mouth disease (FMD), an animal illness of great antiquity. 

A portrait of Fracastoro that has been in the collection of the National Gallery since 1924 has recently been attributed to the renowned Italian painter Titian.
The re-attribution has led scholars to speculate that Titian may have painted the portrait in exchange for syphilis treatment.

Fracastoro's landmarks in Verona

A marble portrait statue of Girolamo Fracastoro by the Carrarese sculptor Danese Cattaneo (completed 1559) stands on a beautiful arch in the central Piazza dei Signori of Verona, near the monument to Dante Alighieri. On its base is the inscription: "HIER FRACASTORIO \ PAULLI PHILIPPI F \ EX PUBLICA AUCTORITATE \ DICATA \ AN SAL MDLIX". According to a popular legend the stone ball Fracastoro holds in his right hand, symbolizing the world, will fall on the first honorable person to walk under the arch. Over the centuries many people have passed every day under the arch, but the ball remains in place.

Fracastoro's landmarks on the Moon 

The lunar crater Fracastorius is named after him.

Geology and fossils

The following is a discussion of the role of Fracastoro in contemporaneous debates about the origin and nature of marine fossils discovered in excavations in Verona during 1517, as quoted from Charles Lyell's Principles of Geology:
It was not till the earlier part of the sixteenth century that geological phenomena began to attract the attention of the Christian nations. At that period a very animated controversy sprung up in Italy, concerning the true nature and origin of marine shells, and other organized fossils found abundantly in the strata of the peninsula. The excavations made in 1517, for repairing the city of Verona, brought to light a multitude of curious petrifactions, and furnished matter for speculation to different authors, and among the rest to Fracastoro, who declared his opinion, that fossil shells had all belonged to living animals, which had formerly lived and multiplied, where their exuviæ are now found. He exposed the absurdity of having recourse to a certain 'plastic force,' which it was said had the power to fashion stones into organic forms; and, with no less cogent arguments, demonstrated the futility of attributing the situation of the shells in question to the Mosaic deluge, a theory obstinately defended by some. That inundation, he observed, was too transient, it consisted principally of fluviatile waters; and if it had transported shells to great distances, must have strewed them over the surface, not buried them at vast depths in the interior of mountains. His clear exposition of the evidence would have terminated the discussion forever, if the passions of mankind had not been enlisted in the dispute; and even though doubts should for a time have remained in some minds, they would speedily have been removed by the fresh information obtained almost immediately afterwards, respecting the structure of fossil remains, and of their living analogues. The clear and philosophical views of Fracastoro were disregarded, and the talent and argumentative powers of the learned were doomed for three centuries to be wasted in the discussion of these two simple and preliminary questions: first, whether fossil remains had ever belonged to living creatures; and secondly, whether, if this be admitted, all the phenomena could be explained by the Noachian deluge.

Seeds of disease theory 
19th century bacteriologists studied Fracastoro’s works, and his "seeds of disease" theory as a predecessor to germ theory.

Works 
Syphilis, sive Morbi Gallici (1530)  
Di Vino Temperatura (1534)  
Homocentricorum sive de Stellis, de Causis Criticorum Dierum Libellus (1535)  
Homocentrica (1538)
Naugerius sive de Poetica Dialogus (c. 1540)
De Contagione et Contagiosis Morbis (1546)
Syphilis  sive  de  morbo  gallico (1539, poem)

Notes

References
 The Latin text available in Google Books (see link below) is from Poemata selecta Italorum: qui seculo decimo sexto latine scripserunt. Oxford and London: Slatter et Munday (Ox.) Longman, Hurst, Rees, & Orme (London) 1808, p. 65-110.

External links

 

[https://books.google.com/books?id=0YsHAAAAQAAJ&dq=Hieronymi+Fracastorii&pg=PA65 Poems (Siphilis, Lib. 1-3 and others) in: Poemata Selecta Italorum, qui Seculo Decimo Sexto Latine scripserunt, London 1808, 65-135. (Latin text)
Hieronymi Fracastorii Syphilis sive morbus Gallicus.  - Basileae, 1536. (Latin text)
Hieronymi Fracastorii Homocentrica; Eiusdem de causis criticorum dierum per ea quae in nobis sunt – 1538. (Latin text)
Hieronymi Fracastorii Veronensis Opera Omnia. 1584. (Astron., medical, & philosophical writings, Latin text)
Hieronymi Fracastorii Veronensis Operum Pars Prior. 1591. (Philosoph. & medical writings, Latin text)
 Fracastor – La Syphilis (1530) – Le Mal Français (Extrait du Livre De contagionibus, 1546) , Paris, 1869 (Latin and French transl.)
Di Cicco, C.: Fracastoro, Girolamo (1478-1553) 17° Congress Eur. Acad. Dermatology and Venereology, Paris 2008, (abstract in English, links to publ.)
 Nahum Tate's English translation of Syphilis (a translation of 1686 in a reprint of 1714), the first full translation of Syphilis into any language.
  Excerpts of an English translation of Syphilis sive Morbus Gallicus
University of Oklahoma Libraries, History of Science Collections, Online Galleries
 Places and memorials related to Girolamo Fracastoro

1478 births
1553 deaths
Scientists from Verona
Italian poets
Italian male poets
16th-century Italian physicians
Italian Renaissance writers
New Latin-language poets
Writers from Verona
Physicians from Verona
16th-century Latin-language writers